Jeremy William Davidson (born 28 April 1974) is a rugby union former player who currently works as a coach.

Playing career
Davidson played lock. He attended Methodist College Belfast.

He played club rugby for Dungannon, Ulster, London Irish and Castres Olympique.

At international level he represented Ireland with 32 caps.
On the 1997 British Lions tour to South Africa, he won 3 Test caps and was voted players' player of the tour.

Davidson captained Ulster and London Irish.

His playing career ended at age 27 due to a long-running knee injury.

Coaching career
Following a spell as director of rugby at Dungannon RFC, Davidson moved on to coach Castres. In June 2009 he became part of the coaching team at Ulster. As of 2017 he was coaching French team Aurillac.  He then coached Brive until 2022 with whom he won promotion to the top tier of French Rugby. Davidson has now reassumed the position of coach at Castres.

Personal life
Davidson and his wife Lisa have one daughter. He also has two sons from a previous relationship.

References

External links
profile on lionsrugby.com
Ireland profile

Irish rugby union coaches
Irish rugby union players
Ireland international rugby union players
Expatriate sportspeople from Northern Ireland in France
Ulster Rugby players
London Irish players
Dungannon RFC players
1974 births
Living people
Rugby union players from Belfast
British & Irish Lions rugby union players from Ireland
People educated at Methodist College Belfast
Sportsmen from Northern Ireland
Ulster Rugby non-playing staff
Expatriate rugby union players from Northern Ireland
Expatriate rugby union players in France